Max Ray Brannon (born December 22, 1933) was an American politician in the state of Georgia.

Brannon, a funeral director, founded (1967) and operated the Max Brannon and Sons Funeral Home in Calhoun, Georgia. He is also a former probate court judge as well as coroner for Gordon County, Georgia. He served in the Georgia State Senate for district 51 from 1981 to 1991.

References

1933 births
Living people
People from Gordon County, Georgia
Georgia (U.S. state) state senators